Andrey Dmitrievich Yudin (born 6 June 1996 in Tolyatti, Samara Oblast) is a Russian male trampoline gymnast.

Personal life 
Andrey Yudin is the son of Zhanna Yudina, a housewife, and Dmitry Yudin, a senior detective in the Department of Internal Affairs of Samara Oblast.

Career 
Yudin began competing in trampoline in 2003. He has won junior competitions in national meets and international events in his junior career.

Yudin debuted as a senior in the 2014 season; he competed in World Cup Trampoline in Arosa and at the 2014 European Championships where he won a gold in the Team event. He competed in his first Worlds at the 2014 World Championships in Daytona Beach, Florida, United States.

In 2015, Yudin competed in World Cup events. He competed at the 2015 World Championships, winning a bronze in men's individual and gold medal in the Team competition.

Yudin competed for Russia at the 2016 Summer Olympics.

References

External links 
 
 
 
 Andrey Yudin at The-Sports.org
 

1996 births
Living people
Russian male trampolinists
Sportspeople from Tolyatti
Olympic gymnasts of Russia
Gymnasts at the 2016 Summer Olympics
Medalists at the Trampoline Gymnastics World Championships
European Games competitors for Russia
Gymnasts at the 2019 European Games
Gymnasts at the 2020 Summer Olympics
21st-century Russian people